is a town located in Fukushima Prefecture, Japan. , the town had an estimated population of 6,090 in 2598 households, and a population density of 20 persons per km². Approximately 66% of the population is over the age of 65.

Geography
Nishiaizu is located at the far northwestern corner of the Aizu region of Fukushima Prefecture, bordered Niigata Prefecture to the north and the west. It is known as the "front door" to the Iide Mountains. About 86 percent of the total area is composed of mountains and forests.

Mountains : Mount Mikunidake (1644 m)
Rivers : Aga River

Neighboring municipalities
Fukushima Prefecture
Kitakata
Yanaizu
Aizubange
Kaneyama
Niigata Prefecture
Aga

Climate
Nishiaizu has a Humid continental climate (Köppen Dfb) characterized by warm summers and cold winters with heavy snowfall.  The average annual temperature in Nishiaizu is 11.8 °C. The average annual rainfall is 1548 mm with September as the wettest month. The temperatures are highest on average in August, at around 25.4 °C, and lowest in January, at around -0.9 °C.

Demographics
Per Japanese census data, the population of Nishiaizu has declined by more than two-thirds over the past 60 years.

History
The area of present-day Nishiaizu was part of ancient Mutsu Province and formed part of the holdings of Aizu Domain during the Edo period. After the Meiji Restoration, it was organized as part of Yama District, Fukushima Prefecture. The town of Nishiaizu was founded on July 1, 1954 through a merger of the villages of Shingo and Okugawa with the town of Nozawa and villages of Onomoto, Tosejima, Mutsuai, Shitatani, Muraoka, Kaminojiri and Hosaka in Kawanuma District. In 2006, Nishiaizu residents decided to decline a merger with the city of Kitakata.

Economy
Nishiaizu is a rural area with a  local economy dependent on agriculture and forestry.

Education
Nishiaizu has one public elementary school and one public junior high school operated by the town government, and one public high school operated by the Fukushima Prefectural Board of Education.
 Nishiaizu Elementary School
 Nishiaizu High School.

Transportation

Railway
 JR East –  Ban'etsu West Line
  -  -   -

Highway
  – Nishiaizu PA

Local attractions
 Enmanji Kannon-dō, the temple building is the one designated Important Cultural Property in Nishiaizu.
 Torioi-Kannon Nyohōji - the gate and four wooden statues are Fukushima Prefectural Important Cultural Properties. The temple houses one of the Aizu region's three important statues of Kannon.

References

External links

Official Website 

 
Towns in Fukushima Prefecture